The ScaleWings SW51 Mustang, formerly marketed as the FK-Lightplanes FK51 Mustang, is an Austrian ultralight, light-sport aircraft and homebuilt aircraft that was designed by ScaleWings of Strasswalchen, Austria and was initially produced by FK-Lightplanes of Krosno, Poland, who introduced it publicly at the AERO Friedrichshafen show in 2013. After FK-Lightplanes ceased production, the design was built by ScaleWings.

The aircraft was first flown in October 2014 and is supplied as a complete ready-to-fly-aircraft or as a kit for amateur construction.

The SW51 is a 70% replica of the North American P-51 Mustang fighter aircraft of the Second World War.

Design and development
The aircraft features a cantilever low-wing, a two-seats in tandem enclosed cockpit under a bubble canopy, fixed or retractable conventional landing gear and a single engine in tractor configuration. The light-sport version for the US market will have fixed landing gear as that category requires.

The design's structure is made from carbon fibre. Its  span wing mounts flaps. The Mustang features electro-hydraulic retractable landing gear, hydraulic disc brakes on the main wheels, dual controls and electrically-operated flaps. It also has three-axis fly-by-wire trim tabs, electrically-adjustable rudder pedals, two internally-mounted  Kevlar/carbon fibre fuel tanks and detachable outer wing panels. The design includes two baggage compartments, one in front of the firewall and one behind the cockpit. The manufacturer has made the aircraft as similar to the original as possible, down to the simulated metal finish, rivets and other details. It also includes a 2000 watt sound system that provides a Rolls-Royce Merlin engine sound and a smoke generator for start-up smoke simulation.

Unlike the P-51 Mustang, the SW51's bubble canopy can slide aft and then is hinged to the right for egress.

The initial FK-Lightplanes model was a European microlight version. When production passed to ScaleWings they developed new models of the design, including a light-sport model, a homebuilt model that is also available ready-to-fly for the US Experimental-Exhibition category and a heavier weight ultralight version.

Operational history
In a 2023 review for AVweb, Kitplanes Editor-at-Large, Paul Dye wrote, "What makes this latest entry in the Mustang look-alike contest special? Its carbon-fiber construction is a place to start. Making composite structural parts in female molds allows a surface finish that simulates every rivet and screw in the original Mustang. Painted properly, it is hard to tell that you aren’t looking at an aluminum airplane unless you knock on the structure and hear the difference. Remarkably, the molds for the SW-51 have every surface feature made into the mold individually with meticulous care, or so we’re told. When you look at the finished product, it shows flush rivets and screws that appear to have typical paint buildup in the dimples and in the heads of the Phillips screws. The simulation is remarkable. Even the rudder looks as if it is fabric covered, with rib stitching and pinked tapes—the whole nine yards. Just like a real Mustang."

Variants
FK51
SW51 Ultralight
The maximum power will be .
SW51 S-LSA
A model by ScaleWings for the US light-sport rules, with fixed landing gear and a fixed pitch propeller.
SW51 Experimental
A model by ScaleWings for US Experimental Amateur-built or Experimental-Exhibition rules as a quick-build kit or fully assembled.

Specifications (FK51 ultralight)

References

External links

FK-Lightplanes official website archives
First flight video

SW51
SW51
2010s Austrian sport aircraft
2010s Austrian ultralight aircraft
Single-engined tractor aircraft
Low-wing aircraft
North American P-51 Mustang replicas
Aerobatic aircraft
Aircraft first flown in 2014